"Mr. Bean Rides Again" is the sixth episode of the British television series Mr. Bean, produced by Tiger Television for Thames Television. It was first broadcast on ITV on 17 February 1992.

Plot

Act 1: The Heart Attack Man and the Postbox
Mr. Bean goes out to post a letter. After using a series of keys to retrieve his car's ignition key, he discovers that the battery is flat, so he decides to take the bus. Upon reaching the bus stop, the man already waiting there has a heart attack, terrifying Bean. Bean tries to revive him by stomping on him, stuffing pills down his throat, trying mouth-to-mouth resuscitation (with the man's magazine) and using electric shock treatment using jump leads connected to a nearby lamppost. The electric shock treatment initially works, but he forgets to remove the jump leads from his hands when the man offers a handshake, giving the man another electric shock, making him pass out again. An ambulance arrives; while the paramedics treat the man, Bean uses the ambulance battery to jump start his Mini. Bean drives off and leaves the ambulance disabled due to a dead battery, forcing the paramedics to call for a replacement.

Afterwards, Bean heads to a postbox, but on the way, he accidentally swallows his postage stamp. He offers to post a letter for a lady, pretends that he has posted it but hangs on to it until she is gone, so that he can use it for his own letter. He removes the stamp using steam from his car radiator, and sticks it to his own letter using a sweet stuck (since the first episode) to the inside of his pocket, and sticks it to his own letter with a fist (when using just one finger to stick it down does not work). The postman arrives to empty the postbox, just as the lady returns to find her letter on the ground. She complains to the postman that there was a stamp on her letter, but now it is gone. Bean hides inside the postbox to avoid getting reprimanded by the postman for the theft of the stamp, and ends up getting locked inside for an unknown amount of time (the original commercial break occurred here), though as the postbox had a "1" showing, it was probably all night. He keeps trying to call out for attention, which goes unnoticed, and then he waves his tie out of the hole only to attract a dog who yanks on it, nearly choking him. When he is finally released (by another postman), he loses his car keys down a drain and is forced to get a bus home, waiting at the bus stop with another man. The man gets on the bus but Bean cannot as all the seats are full, forcing Bean to wait for the next one.

Act 2: The Holiday
At his bedsit, Bean packs for a holiday but his small briefcase does not have enough space for his clothes, as well as some cans of baked beans. He reduces the size of his belongings (often using scissors) to fit them into the case by cutting a pair of trousers (before realizing he already has a pair of shorts), breaking his toothbrush, pouring some toothpaste down the sink, taking just one sandal and packing a flannel instead of a towel, though he does not have the heart to cut up Teddy. After finally managing to fit his things in the small case, he reaches under the bed, only to discover that he has a larger case. However, because his small briefcase is already full, he just puts it into the larger suitcase, along with the one thing he could not pack before, a book.

Bean boards a train and reads the book, sitting across from another man who is also reading. When the man reaches a funny moment in his book, he begins laughing loudly and nonstop, distracting Bean. Bean struggles to cover his ears to avoid the laughter, eliciting curious stares when the man looks up. He finds some chewing gum under the carriage seats, pushes it into his ears and thus it works to block out the noise (even though he could’ve technically told the man to keep it down). Finally, the train guard comes in and asks to check their tickets. Bean, startled by his presence, accidentally throws his book with the ticket tucked inside as a bookmark out of the train window, and the man bursts out laughing once more.

Eventually, Bean boards an aeroplane, but he is forced to look after a sick boy next to him. He tries to cheer the boy up by various means, by sticking magazine bits on his face to amuse him, playing with a self-inflating life jacket (it later flies out of Bean's seat), pretending to vomit and by blowing air into a paper bag and trying to pop it. Realizing the bag has holes in it, he starts searching for another empty bag. While his back is turned, the boy vomits into a sickness bag and offers the bag to Bean, who takes it unaware and pops the bag between his hands. The episode suddenly ends with the popping noise of the bag, leaving the outcome ambiguous.

Cast
Rowan Atkinson as Mr. Bean
Roger Sloman as the heart attack man
Su Douglas as the lady with the letter
John Rolfe as the postman
Stephen Frost as the laughing man
Nick Hancock as the train guard
Eryl Maynard as the air hostess
Hugo Mendez as the young boy

Deleted scene
Mr. Bean waits at a bus stop behind a man; when the bus arrives, the man gets on, but the driver turns Bean away. Determined to be the first in line for the next bus, Bean tries to push in front of a woman (Matilda Ziegler) with a baby in a pram who gets in line ahead of Bean when he steps away for a moment, and a blind man (Robin Driscoll) who pushes in without knowing. Soon after Bean manages to get to the front, several people join the end of the line, and the bus arrives.

But the bus does not stop in front of Bean, it drives on for another few yards – just far enough so that the end of the line logically becomes the front of the line. However, the door of the second bus is at the back; Bean ends up at the end of the line and is left behind again and is forced to wait for the third bus.

Production
Location sequences for this episode were mostly shot on 35 mm film at Dalgarno Gardens in Kensington and studio sequences were recorded before a live audience at Thames Television's Teddington Studios.

The end credits of this episode is one of two to perform a volte-face: showing the reverse of the opening titles where Mr. Bean is sucked back into the sky, and the only one to do so with the street scenery. This is the last episode of to feature the name of the episode in the first opening sequence. In later episodes, the main title of "Mr. Bean" is displayed. The episode title is then displayed once the episode starts.

Casting
Roger Sloman, who played the blind man in the pilot episode, returned as the heart attack man.
Nick Hancock, who played the thief in Mr. Bean Goes to Town, returned as the train guard.
Hugo Mendez, who played the boy playing with the radio-controlled boat model in The Trouble with Mr. Bean, returned as the sick boy.
Stephen Frost, who played the laughing man, previously co-starred with Rowan Atkinson in Witchsmeller Pursuivant, the fifth episode of The Black Adder, and in Corporal Punishment, the second episode of Blackadder Goes Forth.

References

External links

Mr. Bean episodes
1992 British television episodes
Television shows written by Rowan Atkinson
Television shows written by Richard Curtis
Television shows written by Robin Driscoll